Yeol Eum Son (born May 2, 1986, in Wonju, South Korea) is a South Korean classical pianist. She first drew international attention in October 2004 at age 18 when she appeared as a soloist performing Liszt Piano Concerto No. 1 with the New York Philharmonic under the baton of Lorin Maazel on their Asia tour in Seoul, Daejeon, and Tokyo. Son again performed with Maazel and the New York Philharmonic when they returned to the Seoul Arts Center in February 2008, this time as soloist for Beethoven Piano Concerto No. 2.

Her awards include Silver Medals at both the Thirteenth Van Cliburn International Piano Competition (2009) and 2011 International Tchaikovsky Competition, where she also received the Best Chamber Concerto Performance and the Best Performance of the Commissioned Work prizes.

Childhood
Son took her first piano lesson at the age of three and a half. She made a recital debut on Kumho Prodigy Concert Series in July 1998. At the age of twelve, she started studying with pianist Kim Dae-jin. At age sixteen, she entered the Korea National University of Arts to continue her piano studies. At the age of 18, she recorded the complete Chopin Etudes (Op. 10 and Op. 25) for a CD on the Universal Music Label.

Career
She has performed with New York Philharmonic Orchestra, Rotterdam Philharmonic Orchestra, Czech Philharmonic Orchestra, Israel Philharmonic Orchestra, Tokyo Philharmonic Orchestra, Deutsche Radio Philharmonie Saarbrücken Kaiserslautern, NDR Radiophilharmonie, Academy of St. Martin in the Fields, NHK Symphony Orchestra, State Academic Symphony Orchestra of the Russian Federation, Seattle Symphony Orchestra, Mariinsky Theatre Orchestra, Auckland Philharmonia Orchestra and many others under the batons of Yuri Bashmet, Karel Mark Chichon, Myung-whun Chung, James Conlon, Lawrence Foster, Valery Gergiev, Dmitri Kitayenko, Lorin Maazel, Ludovic Morlot, Giordano Bellincampi and others. Since 2006, she has been studying with Arie Vardi at the Hochschule für Musik und Theatre, in Hannover, Germany.<ref>Wilson, Frances. "Meet the Artist – Yeol Eum Son, pianist". The Cross-eyed Pianist, April 11, 2018</ref> In the season 2022-2023, she is artist in residence with Residentie Orkest (The Hague Philharmonic), Amare concert hall The Hague and Royal Conservatory of The Hague.

Writing career
Since May 2010, she has written a monthly column for JoongAng Sunday, the Sunday edition of JoongAng Ilbo, one of Korea's most widely read newspapers.

Awards
 1997: 2nd Prize, International Tchaikovsky Competition for Young Musicians
 1999: 1st Prize, Oberlin International Piano Competition
 2001: 1st Prize, The 7th Ettlingen Piano Competition
 2002: 1st Prize, 53rd Viotti International Music Competition
 2005: 3rd Prize, Arthur Rubinstein International Piano Master Competition. Finalist, XV International Chopin Piano Competition
 2008: 1st Prize, Piano Competition Kissinger Klavierolymp'', related to the festival Kissinger Sommer
 2009: Silver Medal and Steven De Groote Memorial Award for the Best Performance of Chamber Music (shared with Evgeni Bozhanov), Thirteenth Van Cliburn International Piano Competition
 2011: 2nd Prize, Best Chamber Concerto (Mozart Concerto) Performance, Best Performance of the Commissioned Work (by Rodion Shchedrin)  XIV International Tchaikovsky Competition

Discography
 2004: "Chopin: 24 Etudes" (Universal Music)
 2008: "Chopin: Nocturnes for Piano and Orchestra" (Universal Music)
 2009: "13th Van Cliburn Competition: Yeol Eum Son, Silver Medalist" (Harmonia Mundi)
 2012: "Yeol Eum Son, Piano" (O'new World Music)
 2016: "Schumann & Brahms: Sonatas, Romances" (Decca Classics)
 2016: "Modern Times: Berg, Prokofiev, Stravinsky, Ravel" (Decca Classics)
 2018: "Mozart: Piano Concerto No.21 K467 / Sonata No.10 K330" (Onyx Classics)
 2020: "Schumann: Fantasy in C – Kreisleriana – Arabesque" (Onyx Classics)
 2021: "Kapustin" (Onyx Classics)
 2023: "Mozart: Complete Piano Sonatas" (Naïve Records)

References

External links
 

1986 births
Living people
People from Wonju
South Korean classical pianists
South Korean women pianists
South Korean expatriates in the United States
South Korean expatriates in Germany
Prize-winners of the International Tchaikovsky Competition
Prize-winners of the Van Cliburn International Piano Competition
Women classical pianists
Korea National University of Arts alumni
Hochschule für Musik, Theater und Medien Hannover alumni
21st-century women pianists